This is a list of crossings of the North Saskatchewan River in the Canadian provinces of Saskatchewan and Alberta from the river's confluence with the South Saskatchewan River upstream to its source.

Saskatchewan

Alberta

See also 
List of crossings of the South Saskatchewan River

Notes

References 

 
 

North Saskatchewan River